The Highland House is a historic hotel building, now serving as a museum, located at 27 Highland Light Road within the Cape Cod National Seashore
in Truro, Massachusetts. It is located in the Cape Cod National Seashore near the Highland Light in the Truro Highlands Historic District.  The present two story wood-frame building was constructed in 1907 by Isaac Small, whose family had been serving tourists in the area (among them Henry David Thoreau) since 1835.

The building was listed on the National Register of Historic Places in 1975.  It is now known as Highland House Museum and is operated by the Truro Historical Society as a museum of local history.

See also
National Register of Historic Places listings in Cape Cod National Seashore
National Register of Historic Places listings in Barnstable County, Massachusetts

References

External links
 Highland House Museum - Truro Historical Society

National Register of Historic Places in Cape Cod National Seashore
Houses in Barnstable County, Massachusetts
Hotels established in 1907
Houses completed in 1907
1907 establishments in Massachusetts
Museums in Barnstable County, Massachusetts
History museums in Massachusetts
Truro, Massachusetts
Individually listed contributing properties to historic districts on the National Register in Massachusetts
Houses on the National Register of Historic Places in Barnstable County, Massachusetts